The Winds Italia Orbiter is a family of Italian paramotors that were designed by Randy Haney and produced by his company Winds Italia of Bologna for powered paragliding. Now out of production, when the series was available the aircraft were supplied complete and ready-to-fly.

Design and development
The Orbiter series was designed to comply with the US FAR 103 Ultralight Vehicles rules as well as European regulations. They feature a paraglider-style wing, single-place accommodation and a single engine in pusher configuration with a reduction drive and a  diameter two-bladed wooden propeller.

As is the case with all paramotors, take-off and landing is accomplished by foot. Inflight steering is accomplished via handles that actuate the canopy brakes, creating roll and yaw.

Reviewer Rene Coulon noted the Orbiter's design for both its aesthetics and robustness.

Variants
Orbiter
Model with a  Radne Raket 120 engine in pusher configuration with a 3.54:1 ratio reduction drive and a  diameter two-bladed wooden propeller.
Orbiter XP
Higher powered model with a  Cors'Air M21Y engine in pusher configuration with a 1.9:1 ratio reduction drive and a two-bladed wooden propeller. Other reduction ratios were factory available as options. The XP was supplied without an electric starter or battery to save weight.

Specifications (Orbiter)

See also
Winds Italia Raven - a powered hang glider design from the same manufacturer

References

Orbiter
2000s French ultralight aircraft
Single-engined pusher aircraft
Paramotors